John Berg may refer to:

John Berg (actor) (1949–2007), American actor
John Berg (art director) (1932–2015), American art director
John Berg (priest) (born 1970), American Catholic priest

See also
John (given name)
Berg (surname)